Seemi Raheel (born February 26, 1954) is a Pakistani senior actress working in Urdu television and films since decades. She is the mother of actors Mehreen Raheel and Daniyal Raheel.

Filmography

Film

Television series

References

External links
 

1957 births
20th-century Pakistani actresses
Pakistani film actresses
21st-century Pakistani actresses
Living people
Punjabi people
Pakistani television actresses
Actresses in Urdu cinema